Frank H. Holley (May 19, 1880 – October 9, 1949) was an American politician from Maine. Holley, a Republican from Anson, Maine, was first elected to the Maine House of Representatives in 1916. Re-elected in 1918, 1920 and 1922, he was chosen as Speaker of the Maine House of Representatives in 1923. In 1924, he was elected to represent Somerset County in the Maine Senate. Re-elected for a second term in the Senate in 1926, Holley was elected Senate President.

References

1880 births
1949 deaths
People from Anson, Maine
Republican Party members of the Maine House of Representatives
Speakers of the Maine House of Representatives
Presidents of the Maine Senate
20th-century American politicians